Shahrukh Ali (born 11 August 1996) is a Pakistani cricketer. He made his first-class debut for Zarai Taraqiati Bank Limited in the 2018–19 Quaid-e-Azam Trophy on 25 September 2018. He made his List A debut for Zarai Taraqiati Bank Limited in the 2018–19 Quaid-e-Azam One Day Cup on 30 September 2018.

References

External links
 

1996 births
Living people
Pakistani cricketers
Zarai Taraqiati Bank Limited cricketers
Place of birth missing (living people)